The Saint Andrew's Scots School, also referred to as Saint Andrew's, is an Argentine bilingual school in Olivos, Vicente López Partido, Buenos Aires Province.

Established in 1838 in downtown Buenos Aires, it is the oldest school of British origin in South America.

The school offers early childhood, primary and secondary education and has a university founded in 1988.

The school's campus is located in San Fernando, Tigre Partido, inside the urban area known as Greater Buenos Aires.

History

The school was established in Argentina on September 1, 1838, by a group of Scottish immigrants who wanted to educate their children in their native language, culture and religion. At the beginning only girls were admitted, although the school accepted boys soon after.

The first location of the school was in Piedras 55, in downtown Buenos Aires. The institution was later moved to the neighbourhood of Constitución, where children from many nationalities attended. The chapel moved to the streets of Belgrano and Perú where it still remains.

In 1882, Scotsman Alexander Watson Hutton (considered the father of Argentine football), arrived to Buenos Aires after being hired by St. Andrew's as headmaster. Hutton encouraged the teaching of sports at the school, which conflicted with the position of the authorities of not considering sports as important as he did. Due to his disagreeing with the policies of the establishment, Hutton resigned one year later. After leaving St. Andrew's, Hutton founded his own institution, the Buenos Aires English High School, where he applied his ideas on the teaching of sports in Argentina.

In 1947, the school moved to Olivos, Vicente López Partido, and in 1988 the institution opened the University of San Andrés. A new campus by Jeffrey J. Berk Arquitectos was inaugurated in 2018 with interior design by Rosan Bosch.

Sports

Football pioneers

In 1890 the college established "St. Andrew's Athletic Club", whose football team was formed by railway workers. The sport had been introduced in Argentina in 1867, with St. Andrew's being one of the first clubs of the country.

St. Andrew's won the first Primera División championship organised in 1891, by the Argentine Association Football League, the first football association in the country and predecessor of current Argentine Football Association.

After winning the title (shared with Old Caledonians), St. Andrew's did not take part in official competitions until 1894, being dissolved soon after.

Present days

In 1911 the principal of the school, William Hardie, founded the Club San Andrés, a sports club that only admitted alumni and students. Sports currently practised at the club include rugby union, field hockey and association football. Its rugby team plays at the Torneo de la URBA Grupo I, the first division in the league system of the Unión de Rugby de Buenos Aires.

Today the school has many sports such as athletics, badminton, basketball, association football, rugby union, swimming, tennis and volleyball.

See also

 Christianity in Argentina
 Education in Argentina
 List of schools in Argentina

References

External links

 

1838 establishments in Argentina
1891 establishments in Argentina
Bilingual schools
Christian schools in Argentina
Defunct football clubs in Buenos Aires
Educational institutions established in 1838
Elementary and primary schools in Argentina

Girls' schools in Argentina

Mixed-sex education
Presbyterian schools
Presbyterianism in South America
Schools in Buenos Aires
Secondary schools in Argentina
Scottish Argentine
Tigre Partido
Vicente López Partido